KIVY may refer to:

KIVY (AM), a radio station (1290 AM) licensed to serve Crockett, Texas, United States
KIVY-FM, a radio station (92.7 FM) licensed to serve Crockett
KIVY-LD, a low-power television station (channel 17, virtual 16) licensed to serve Crockett

Kivy (framework), an open source Python library for developing mobile apps
Peter Kivy (born 1934), American musicologist

See also
Kivi (disambiguation)
Kiwi (disambiguation)